Scot D. Ryersson (September 10, 1960 in Suffern, New York) is an illustrator, graphic artist and writer. In addition to many critiques and essays on film and literature, he is the co-author of the biography Infinite Variety: The Life and Legend of the Marchesa Casati, as well as The Marchesa Casati: Portraits of a Muse.

Ryersson is Co-Director of The Casati Archives, devoted to preserving the artistic and cultural legacy of Luisa Casati. It was founded by Ryersson and Michael Orlando Yaccarino in 1999 upon the original publication of Infinite Variety. In addition to original materials, books and ephemera, this library contains artwork reproductions and photographs of and inspired by Marchesa Casati.

Trained at London’s Chelsea School of Art and Design, for many years Ryersson was a motion picture poster designer in the United States, Canada and Europe. Credits include advertising campaigns for The Silence of the Lambs (1991), Ghost (1990) and Witness (1985), The Changeling (1980), Children of the Corn (1984), Working Girl (1988), She Devil (1989), Pet Sematary (1989) and Presumed Innocent (1990). Ryersson was presented with two Art Directors of London Awards for his poster designs for the British films Evil Under the Sun (1982) and Another Country (1984). The concept poster design for The Silence of the Lambs was voted fifth place of the "Fifty Greatest Film Posters of All Time" by Britain's Empire magazine, while earning sixteenth place for the same accolade by the US publication Premiere in their August 2001 issue.

Bibliography

Books

Articles co-written with Michael Orlando Yaccarino

 Painted Lady-The Marchesa Casati; Bizarre (UK): 2000.
 Medusa in Pearls-The Marchesa Casati; aRUDE (U.S.A.): 2001.
 Passion Player-Gabriele D'Annunzio; aRUDE (U.S.A.): 2001.
 The Dandy Boys; Bizarre (UK): 2001.
 Daydream Believer-The Marchesa Casati; The Idler (UK): 2002.
Haute Bizarre-Couturier Claudia Scarsella; Art-is-Life (U.S.A.): 2002.
Siren of the Century-The Marchesa Casati, Art-is-Life (U.S.A.): 2002.
Aesthetic Assassin-Comte Robert de Montesquiou; Art-is-Life (U.S.A.): 2004.
Life on the High Seas of Culture-Nancy Cunard; Art-is-Life (U.S.A.): 2004.
 Luisa and Gabriele; Primo (Belgium): 2005.
 The Temptations of St. Jean; aRUDE (U.S.A.): 2005.

Theatrical works

Misc
 
 Fire and Ice: The Life and Films of Brigitte Helm; Filmfax (U.S.A.): No. 84, April/May 2001.

Literary awards

All are for Infinite Variety: The Life and Legend of the Marchesa Casati (various editions)
 What We Love Selection, October 2006, Deutsch Vogue (Germany)
 Best Books Winter 2004/2005, Elegant Lifestyle (U.S.A./UK./Germany)
 Banner Books of the Year, 2004, Pointe Magazine, (U.S.A.)
 Top Ten Most Read Books, 2003, Academia News (Italy)
 Book of the Week Selection, March 3–9, 2003 La Repubblica (Italy)
 Biography of the Year 2000, First Finalist, Independent Publisher Book Awards (U.S.A.)
 Bestseller List – ‘Books Everyone Likes,’ 2000, Lambda Literary Foundation (U.S.A.)
 Paperback of the Week Selection, October 2–8, 2000, Time Out London (UK)
 Certificate of Merit in Biographical Writing, 2000, Writer’s Digest (U.S.A.)
 Book of the Year Selection, 1999, Bibel (Sweden)
 Book of the Year Selection, 1999, Gay Times (UK)
 Book of the Year Selection, 1999, Sunday Telegraph (UK)

References

Other sources
David Livingstone. "Marchesa's lifestyle and look live on; Biography of Italian heiress is filled with photos of her smoky eyes and flaming hair". Toronto Star [Toronto, Ont] 27 Aug 2009: L.1. 
Stephen Canham. "The Princess of Wax: A Cruel Tale by Scot D. Ryersson", Marvels & Tales, Vol. 18, No. 1, 2004.
Maggie Alderson. "Unhappy squanderer", The Sydney Morning Herald, Edition: Late, Section: Spectrum, pg. 4
Vera Rule. "Saturday Review: Books: Painted ladies: Vera Rule on artful society dames: Infinite Variety: by Scot D Ryersson and Michael Orlando Yaccarino 249pp, Pimlico, pounds 12.50: La Divina Comtesse by Pierre Apraxine: 192pp, Yale, pounds 16.95", The Guardian [London (UK)] 13 Jan 2001: SATURDAY.8. 
Richard Edmonds. "Books: Vanity and egotism of two society beauties La Divine Comtesse -photographs of the Countess de Castiglione. Edited by Pierre Apraxine (Yale, pounds 16.95). Infinite Variety, the life and legend of the Marchesa Casati. By Scot D Ryersson and Michael Orlando Yaccarino (Pimlico, pounds 12.50): [POST Edition]". Birmingham Post [Birmingham (UK)] 14 Oct 2000: 53. 
Leslie Chess Feller. "Infinite Variety". New York Times Book Review (Jan 9, 2000): 7.21. 
Susanne Jones. "Those eyes, those lips...". The Globe and Mail [Toronto, Ont] 21 Jan 2000: R.13. 
Betty Ann Jordan. "A groaning coffee table". National Post [Don Mills, Ont] 11 Dec 1999: 6. 
Moorea Black. "Spectacular special effects." Spectator (00386952); 11/20/99, Vol. 283 Issue 8937, p50, 1p, 3 Color Photographs. (book review of Infinite Variety).
Paul Gediman and Jeff Zaleski. "Forecasts: Nonfiction. INFINITE VARIETY: The Life and Legend of the Marchesa Casati Scot D. Ryersson and Michael Orlando Yaccarino, foreword by Quentin Crisp. Viridian (Baker & Taylor, dist.), $27.95 (256p) ". Publishers Weekly, 11/1/1999, Vol. 246 Issue 44, p69, 1/5p.
Colin McDowell. "A life of excess." Sunday Times [London (UK)] 19 Sep 1999: 6. (book review of Infinite Variety)
Lucy Hughes-Hallett. "Shock and awe", Spectator (00386952); 1/16/2010, Vol. 312 Issue 9464, p41-41, 1p (reviews the book The Marchesa Casati: Portraits of a Muse).
Lucy Dallas. "Infinite Variety: The life and legend of the Marchesa Casati.". Times Literary Supplement 10/06/2000, Issue 5088, p36, 1/5p (book review)
 Contemporary Authors Online, Gale, 2004, 2007.

1960 births
Living people
American graphic designers
Film poster artists
People from Suffern, New York